Haters Back Off is a Netflix original television comedy series based on the YouTube character Miranda Sings created by Colleen Ballinger. Its two seasons were released in October 2016 and 2017, respectively. The "surreal and absurd" series centers around the family life of Miranda Sings, a sheltered, self-absorbed, overconfident and untalented young performer who seeks fame on YouTube. The half-hour episodes depict Miranda's road to fame, and the price she pays for trampling on the feelings of others. The show stars Colleen Ballinger as Miranda, Angela Kinsey as her mother Bethany, Steve Little as her uncle Jim, Francesca Reale as her sister Emily, and Erik Stocklin as her best friend and love interest, Patrick. Season 2 added Matt Besser as Miranda's estranged father. Netflix described the show as "a bizarre family comedy, and a commentary on society today and our fascination with fame."

The series was developed by Colleen Ballinger and her brother, Christopher Ballinger, together with showrunners Gigi McCreery and Perry Rein. It was produced by Brightlight Pictures. The show was named for Miranda Sings' signature catchphrase that she uses when responding to negative comments on her YouTube videos. Haters Back Off was one of the first scripted series created by a YouTube personality.

The first season was released on October 14, 2016. It follows Miranda from the time she uploads her first video until one of her videos goes viral. The second season was released on October 20, 2017. It concerns Miranda's schemes to raise money from fans, leading to her family's financial ruin and her 15 minutes of fame on a New York stage. Ballinger told Entertainment Weekly that the writers of Season 2 continued to craft the scenarios and plot points "from things that actually happened to me in my career". Netflix canceled the series after two seasons. Ballinger and Stocklin married in 2018.

Background

Miranda Sings

Since 2008, Colleen Ballinger has posted videos as her comically talentless, narcissistic and quirky character, Miranda Sings, primarily on the YouTube channel Miranda Sings. The character is a satire of bad, but egotistical, performers who film themselves singing as a form of self-promotion. Miranda is portrayed as a home-schooled young woman who is eccentric and infantilized, narcissistically believes that she was born famous, and is obsessed with show business fame. Miranda uses spoonerisms and malapropisms, is irritable, ludicrously self-absorbed and self-righteous, socially awkward, and has a defiant, arrogant attitude. She responds to people who offer criticism with the catchphrase, "Haters back off!"

In March 2009, Ballinger uploaded a Miranda video called "Free Voice Lesson", full of awful singing advice, that quickly became her first viral sensation. This led to requests for Ballinger to perform live as Miranda, and she later began to tour worldwide. The Miranda Sings YouTube channel has received more than 2 billion views and has more than 10 million subscribers. Miranda has appeared in character on television shows, and Ballinger released a 2015 book, Selp-Helf, written in Miranda's voice, that ranked No. 1 on The New York Times Best Seller list for Advice, How-To & Miscellaneous. Her second Miranda book, My Diarrhe, appeared on the same best seller list in 2018.

Development
Ballinger told interviewers that she and her brother Chris began to develop the idea for the show about five or six years before it premiered. At first they considered a film treatment but later decided on a television series format. Ballinger chose Netflix over HBO to produce Haters Back Off because she felt that Netflix understood and was enthusiastic about the character and its online origin and fanbase. Comparing the show to Christopher Guest's Waiting for Guffman, showrunner Perry Rein said: "This is the first time we've done a show about a really bad dancer and singer. [It has] characters that take themselves very seriously in their very small worlds." The show was one of the first scripted series created by a YouTube personality.

On YouTube, Miranda always had an offstage relationship with her mother and uncle, and Ballinger long had the idea for Miranda's best friend, Patrick; these characters were first seen in Season 1 of the series, together with another new character, Emily, Miranda's sister. Ballinger said that she wanted to use the longer format of the series to expose Miranda's vulnerability and make her believable; to explain the source of the insecurities that make Miranda so rude and eccentric. Emily is the only normal person in Miranda's family, but they treat her as the odd one, like Marilyn in The Munsters. The series expanded Miranda's world seen in YouTube. Miranda represents an "extreme version of what the average gawky teenage girl may be feeling." Season 2 introduced Miranda's estranged father, played by Matt Besser.

/Film mused: "Haters Back Off seems like a smart move for Netflix. [A] streaming content provider seems like a natural fit. Her built-in audience is already used to watching original content online". TechCrunch commented: "[T]he rise of YouTube-fueled online influencers has been breathtaking ... building big audiences beyond the reach, knowledge and control of traditional entertainment gatekeepers, including the networks. ... Netflix can ... leverage the audiences of these online stars, and their marketing reach, to drive the fans to new properties ... online, where their fans already routinely seek entertainment". In September 2016, the series was included in The Wall Street Journal's list of "The 6 Best New Things to Stream in October". Bustle.com listed "11 Reasons You Should Watch ... Haters Back Off", writing that "Miranda has become emblematic of a new kind [of] star-seeker in the digital age: a youngster who decides that waiting for a fame-making opportunity simply won't do and that in order to become visible (and ostensibly beloved), you have to create the opportunities for visibility yourself."

Cast

Main
Colleen Ballinger as Miranda Sings, a talentless, egotistical, quirky, home-schooled young "want-to-be star"; in Season 2 Ballinger briefly also plays herself.
Angela Kinsey as Bethany, Miranda's hypochondriac mother
Steve Little as Jim, Miranda's enabling uncle and manager
Erik Stocklin as Patrick Mooney, Miranda's best friend and neighbor
Francesca Reale as Emily, Miranda's exasperated, voice-of-reason-and-normality sister
Matt Besser as Kelly, Miranda and Emily's estranged father and Jim's brother (Season 2)

Recurring
Chaz Lamar Shepherd as Keith, a local pastor (Season 1)
Dylan Playfair as Owen Trent, the church choir's dreamy but narcissistic guitarist (Season 1)
Harvey Guillén as Harvey, the manager and son of the owner of the fish shop (Season 1)
Lindsay Navarro as Kleigh, Emily's friend (Season 1)
Rachelle Gillis as April, Owen's girlfriend (Season 1)
Mel Tuck as Old Man (Seasons 1 and 2)
Simon Longmore as Dr. Schofele, Bethany's doctor (Seasons 1 and 2)
Kara Hayward as Amanda (Season 2)

Guest stars
Ben Stiller as himself (Season 1)
John Early as Maureen, the Mattress Queen (Season 1)
C. Ernst Harth as Taco Ta-Go Manager (Season 2)
Joey Graceffa as himself (Season 2)
Michael Bean as Gallery owner (Season 2)
Frankie Grande as himself (Season 2)
Lochlyn Munro as Brian Maxwell, a talent agent (Season 2)

Production and promotion
Season 1 of Haters Back Off began filming in April 2016 in and around Port Coquitlam, British Columbia, near Vancouver, which substitutes, in the series, for Miranda's hometown, Tacoma, Washington. Filming on Season 1 wrapped on June 3, 2016. Ballinger began promotions for season 1 in January 2016 with a comic YouTube video announcement. Miranda was featured on the cover of Variety, and in a feature article about the show, in June 2016. Ballinger also promoted the show on her social media, including with an original song about it performed by Miranda. On September 1, 2016, Netflix released the first production stills from Season 1. On September 21, the show released its first of a series of teasers. Ballinger appeared on The Tonight Show on October 14, 2016, the release date, to promote the series.

Season 2 filmed in and around Vancouver from April until June 5, 2017. Ballinger began promotions for Season 2 in August 2017 with an appearance on Live with Kelly and Ryan. Ballinger announced the release date of Season 2 in character as Miranda on the Miranda Sings YouTube channel on September 11, 2017. On the same date, she released a new original song on Miranda's YouTube channel to promote the season. On October 10, 2017, Netflix released the official trailer for Season 2. On October 16, Angela Kinsey appeared on the Today show to promote the series, and three days later she was featured in a People video. The eight episodes of Season 2 were released by Netflix on October 20, 2017. On October 23, 2017, Ballinger returned to Live with Kelly and Ryan for a Halloween-themed show and appeared  on The Tonight Show to discuss Haters Back Off. Two days later, Variety published a feature on Season 2. On October 30, Ballinger appeared as Miranda on Total Request Live, and the next day, she appeared again on Live with Kelly and Ryan. On January 2, 2018, Ballinger returned to Live with Kelly and Ryan to promote the show.

Netflix canceled the series after two seasons. Ballinger and Stocklin married in 2018.

Episodes

Series overview

Season 1 (2016)

Season 2 (2017)
The second season has 8 episodes, bringing the total number of episodes to 16.

Reception
The first season of Haters Back Off received mixed reviews from critics. On Rotten Tomatoes, the season has a rating of 50%, based on 20 reviews, with an average rating of 4.67/10. The site's critical consensus reads, "Haters Back Off is bizarre, painful, and often times excruciatingly funny – yet the appeal of the YouTube transport doesn't quite carry over in the longer television format." On Metacritic, the season has a score of 54 out of 100, based on 9 critics, indicating "mixed or average reviews". The show debuted as the 2nd most popular digital original series in the US for the week of October 14–20, 2016. It won the "Best Comedy" award at the 2016 CelebMix Awards.

Positive reviews of Season 1 include Robert Lloyd's in the Los Angeles Times, who observed that, unlike in Miranda's YouTube videos, the character's actions in the TV series have consequences and affect the other characters and their feelings. Lloyd thought that the series succeeds in "shaping a funny idea into a semblance of life". He praised the performances, especially Kinsey's. The Guardian printed two positive reviews: Brian Moylan called the series a "hilarious transfer to Netflix. ... Ballinger gets at something that is not only a cultural critique but often hits on the fragility of egos and everyone's need for acceptance." In their other review, Stuart Heritage wrote: "It's a uniformly singular sitcom about the effects of fame, and frequently a very funny one. ... [I]t is great, once you've attuned yourself to its quirks". Melanie McFarland, on NPR, compared Miranda's world with Pee-wee Herman's, saying that both are "perversely funny, cartoonish worlds that also manage to be weirdly innocent. 'There's just that sly element of wrongness about it that makes it oh so right.'" Daniel D'Addario wrote in Time magazine that the series "is imperfect, but it's also more than it needed to be. ... Ballinger examine[s] what the obsession with having fans papers over and the new problems it creates." Paste magazine ranked Haters Back Off as the 9th "best new Netflix Original Series of 2016". Jon O'Brien later wrote for Metro:

Even if you're not particularly a fan of Miranda Sings ... there's still plenty to enjoy about Haters Back Off. Little is wonderfully absurd as the uncle almost as deluded as Miranda herself, while Reale elicits genuine sympathy as the only "normal" character regularly bulldozed by her sister's ambition. And by combining the strange small-town suburbia of Napoleon Dynamite and cartoonish antics of Pee-wee Herman, the show remains one of Netflix's most wonderfully weird originals.

TheWrap's Michael E. Ross called the series an "antic, sometimes wise, often laugh-out-loud funny case of art imitating life imitating art", noting that "there are times ... when the veneer of ego is stripped away, and we discover the shy, insecure young woman behind the bluster. Haters reflects a hearty sense of humor about the genesis of online celebrity. ... [W]hat resonates ... is Miranda's underlying humanity, her basic drive to be recognized, to stand apart from the crowd. And we can all relate to the pain of rejection". Jasef Wisener of TVOvermind.com gave the series 3.8 stars out of 5. He was favorably impressed by the character development and the performances, especially Ballinger's and Reale's. He also liked its structure and musical score, but felt that the exposition was sometimes bogged down in the early episodes by its explanation of details and sometimes panders to Miranda's established internet audience; he felt that the series improves in the later episodes. He disliked the sexual innuendos and found Miranda's relationship with Uncle Jim uncomfortable, although these are elements carried over from Miranda's YouTube videos. The A.V. Club's Danette Chavez commented that Ballinger's "portrayal of Miranda is multidimensional in spite of the character's single-mindedness. ... Haters fleshes out the environment that would spawn such an egotistical personality. ... [L]aughs are as consistently delivered" with zany comedy, although the "domestic strife and even anguish" makes the series nearly a dramedy. But she felt that "sometimes the foreshadowing is just a little too foreboding. ... the tonal shifts don't always jibe."

In a mixed review for New York magazine's Vulture site, Jen Chaney judged that "not everything in Haters Back Off! works. ... If you find Miranda Sings irritating after watching a two-minute YouTube clip, you should find something else to put in your queue. But ... fans ... who have a reasonable amount of patience will likely find some redeeming qualities to latch onto, especially as the episodes progress. ... Miranda is a purposely maddening character. But Ballinger commits to her so fully and with such specific physicality ... that she's often mesmerizing to watch. ... [But] maybe Miranda Sings is better in shorter doses." Similarly, for The New York Times, James Poniewozik wrote that:

Like Miranda's performances, Haters can be terrible and transfixing at the same time. ... Ballinger commits to Miranda's hunger and histrionics. ... There's a deeper pathos to Miranda's situation, but the season doesn't delve deeply into that until late, by which time haters will have long since backed off. ... There's a lot in Haters Back Off! to gratify Ms. Ballinger's YouTube fan base. ... Beyond the winces, there's something human in its comedy of internet thirst: the insatiable drive to put a piece of oneself out into the world and hit refresh, refresh, refresh.

Brian Lowry, writing for CNN, had a mostly negative reaction. He felt that while the series' "critique of a fame-obsessed culture certainly has merit", and that the later episodes "reward patience", the show was too "cartoon-like", and "there's a sense that the series is stretched beyond what it has to offer." Keith Uhlich, in The Hollywood Reporter, found the gags funny, but he concluded that although Miranda is "an acidic critique of the very celebrity strivers who make up the majority of the YouTube community", it is more effective "in short bursts". In "an eight-episode Netflix series ... the lampoon loses its edge". He also thought that much of the pathos in the series is "unearned, unconvincing" and the characters are "shallow vessels freighted down by contrived plot complications . ... And there's more than a bit of that vainglorious YouTubers' entitlement in where Haters ultimately ends up, the satire finally curdling into smugness." Sonia Saraiya of Variety did not think that the series has "the same organic appeal as Ballinger's bizarre, pastiche-y videos. ... Miranda lacks some of the innocent naivete that makes her character work on YouTube. ... Miranda's behavior ... could be raucously hilarious [for some viewers], an example of theater-geek self-obsession run amok. For me, anyway, Miranda's obsessions and absorptions ... prove to be more tragic than hilarious." Rob Lowman of the Los Angeles Daily News wrote: "The series seems to want to exist somewhere between a Pee-wee Herman world, where Miranda exists within her own reality, and Waiting for Guffman or other parodies of self-important clueless people. It doesn't succeed as either, nor on its own terms.

References

External links
 Haters Back Off on Netflix
 
 Series Twitter account
 Season 1 Trailer (2016)
 Season 2 Trailer (2017)

2010s American comedy television series
2016 American television series debuts
2017 American television series endings
Narcissism in television
English-language Netflix original programming
Television series based on Internet-based works
Television series about social media